Irina Alekseyevna Abysova (born 7 November 1980 in Moscow) is a Russian open water swimmer and professional triathlete. In 2003, 2007, 2009 and 2010 she won the Russian Triathlon Championships and she took part in the Olympics in 2008 in Beijing and the 2012 Games in London. She is the winner of the 2013 ITU Aquathlon World Championship.

Sports career 
Abysova started her career at the age of six when she was admitted to the aquatic section of the so-called Olympic Village (Олимпийская деревня) in Moscow. At 13 years old she entered the sports school called Pioneer Palace (Дворец пионеров) and two years later she joined the МССУОР, a vocational school for Olympic athletes (Московское среднее специальное училище олимпийского резерва, or Московское специальное спортивное училище олимпийского резерва).

In 1999 Abysova, with the title “Master of Sports” (мастер спорта), went on to the РГАФК, the Sports University of Moscow (now РГУФКСиТ). In 2001 Abysova won the open water or long distance swimming silver medal (10 km) in Fukuoka. In 2002, however, she felt that her career as a swimmer might be coming to an end and turned to triathlon, winning the Russian Triathlon Championship in the subsequent year. In 2003 Abysova joined the sports club Ozërki (СК Озёрки) and concluded her university studies.

In 2005, one year after having become a mother, she won the Russian Winter Triathlon Championships and was also active in the elite section of the German club TUS Griesheim. At the Olympics in Beijing in 2008 Abysova had a bad bicycle accident during the event and was unable to finish.

In 2009 the French triathlon club TOC Cesson Sevigne mentioned her among its international stars but Abysova did not take part in the French Club Championship Series Lyonnaise des Eaux. In 2011, Abysova opened the new season in Cyprus, where the Russian triathletes had their training camp. At the Volkswagen Aldiana Triathlon (27 March 2011) she placed first on the Olympic Distance.

In 2012, she took part in the women's triathlon at the Olympic games, finishing in 13th place.

ITU competitions 
In the eight years from 2003 to 2010, Irina Abysova took part in 51 ITU competitions and achieved 16 top ten positions. Unless indicated otherwise the following events are triathlons (Olympic Distance) and belong to the Elite category.

DNF = Did not finish

Personal 
In 2003 Abysova married the Russian triathlete and 2008 Olympian Igor Sysoyev. In 2004, Abysova had a daughter.

Gallery

References

External links 

 Profile at the Russian Triathlon Confederation 
 

1980 births
Living people
Russian female triathletes
Female long-distance swimmers
Russian female swimmers
Olympic triathletes of Russia
Triathletes at the 2008 Summer Olympics
Triathletes at the 2012 Summer Olympics
Sportspeople from Moscow
World Aquatics Championships medalists in open water swimming